"Thank the Lord for the Night Time" is a song written and performed by Neil Diamond.  It reached No. 13 on the U.S. pop chart in 1967   and appeared on his 1967 album Just for You.

"Thank the Lord for the Night Time" was produced by Ellie Greenwich and Jeff Barry.

Billboard said the song has a "strong dance beat in strong support of Diamond's top vocal work."  Cash Box said that it's a "driving, thumping, rhythmic, pounding venture" that "is likely to get a lot of exposure."  It ranked No. 100 on Billboard magazine's Top 100 singles of 1967.

Other charting versions
Charlie Major released his take on the song as a single in 1998 which reached No. 48 on the Canadian chart.  It was featured on his 1997 album Everything's Alright.

References

1967 songs
1967 singles
1998 singles
Songs written by Neil Diamond
Neil Diamond songs
Charlie Major songs
Bang Records singles